Conny Pohlers (born 16 November 1978) is a German former professional footballer who played as a forward. From 1998 she played in the Women's Bundesliga and from 2001 in the Germany national team.

Club career
Born, Halle, Pohlers comes from a football playing family. Her father played and her mother was once the top goal scorer in a regional league. She first played at the age of seven with FSV '67 Halle. In 1994, she moved to 1. FFC Turbine Potsdam. In the 2003 season, she played in the American professional league, WUSA, with the Atlanta Beat. In February 2007 she announced that she would be transferring to 1.FFC Frankfurt for the 2007–08 season. In 2013, playing for VfL Wolfsburg, she again became a Bundesliga champion, and on 19 May she scored a goal in Wolfsburg's 3–2 Cup Final win against her old team, Turbine Potsdam.

After the 2013–14 season she ended her career.

International goals

Honours

Club 
 Bundesliga: 2004, 2006, 2008, 2013, 2014
 DFB-Pokal: 2004, 2005, 2006, 2008, 2011, 2013
 UEFA Women's Champions League 2005, 2008, 2013, 2014

International 
 FIFA Women's World Cup: 2003
 Football at the Summer Olympics: Bronze medal 2004, 2008
 UEFA Women's Championship: 2005
 Algarve Cup: 2006

Individual
 Bundesliga top goal scorer 2002, 2006, 2011
 Third all-time top scorer UEFA Women's Champions League with 48 goals
 UEFA Women's Champions League top scorer: 2004–05

References

External links
 National Team information – Conny Pohlers

1978 births
Living people
Women's association football forwards
German women's footballers
Germany women's international footballers
2003 FIFA Women's World Cup players
Footballers at the 2004 Summer Olympics
Footballers at the 2008 Summer Olympics
Olympic bronze medalists for Germany
VfL Wolfsburg (women) players
Women's United Soccer Association players
1. FFC Turbine Potsdam players
Sportspeople from Halle (Saale)
1. FFC Frankfurt players
Atlanta Beat (WUSA) players
Expatriate women's soccer players in the United States
Olympic medalists in football
Medalists at the 2008 Summer Olympics
Medalists at the 2004 Summer Olympics
FIFA Women's World Cup-winning players
Washington Spirit players
National Women's Soccer League players
Olympic footballers of Germany
UEFA Women's Championship-winning players
Footballers from Saxony-Anhalt
German expatriate sportspeople in the United States
1. FFC 08 Niederkirchen players